Manufacturing Consent: Changes in the Labor Process Under Monopoly Capitalism is a scholarly book written by the British Marxist sociologist Michael Burawoy.

See also
 Monopoly capitalism

External links
Reflections on Burawoy's Manufacturing Consent—Babson College
JSTOR: American Journal of Sociology, Vol. 87, No. 1 (Jul., 1981), pp. 192-194—JSTOR
Department of Sociology, University of California Berkeley—University of California, Berkeley

Books about capitalism
Industrial relations
Books about labour
Marxist books